Phidim Municipality is the headquarters of the Panchthar District in the Province No. 1 of eastern Nepal. Phidim was upgraded to a 'municipality' from a 'village', when a development committee merged with other VDCs (village development committees) - including the Phidim, Chokmagu and Siwa villages - on  May 18, 2014. It offers a route for trekkers and locals, who travel to and from the Taplejung district bordering with the Tibetan Autonomous Region of China. It is also a commercial hub for the rural surroundings.

Transport
Phidim is connected to the rest of the country through the Mechi Highway, a  road which begins in Kechana of Jhapa district and ends in Phungling. Passenger buses and jeeps to Phidim are available at Birtamod and Ilam. A new Madhya Pahadi Rajmargha connects Phidim to the Athrai Rular Municipality of Terhathum district, which is linked to Koshi Highway in Myanglung (headquarters of Terhathum District). Madhya Pahadi Rajmargha, one of the roads linking east and west Nepal through hilly areas, starts from the Panchthar district and is connected to Phidim. Koshi Corridor which is under construction connects Phidim directly to Dharan in less than 5 hours which is also the shortest route to terai region. Phidim has hotels and inns for accommodation and food.

Geography
Phidim is within a valley in the foothills of the Himalayas in eastern Nepal. It is a hill township. Phidim is a six-hour drive from Birtamod through a winding road via Ilam. Phidim, offers views of the Himalaya and other hills. Phidim is characterized by tin-roofed houses and small concrete buildings. Two rivers —Phewa and Hewa— surround the hill where the town is located.

Demography
At the time of the 2001 Nepal census, Phidim had a population of 13,652 people. The inhabitants are Limbu, Magar,  Yakha, Gurung,  Rai, Tamang, so-called Dalit, Brahmin and  Newar, which makes it one of the most culturally diverse places in eastern Nepal.

Climate
The climate of Phidim remains warm during the summer and is mild in the winter. Maximum temperature in the summer is 35 °C, whereas in winter, it falls to 5 °C.

Economy
Because of its fertile soil and irrigation, Phidim produces rice, potato, cardamom and tea. Kanchenjunga Tea Estate, one of major producers of Nepal tea, has a field office in Phidim.

Incidents
February 5, 2010: A fire that started from a hotel in Phidim killed three people. Property worth 2 million rupees were estimated to be damaged. It was reported that three dozen people were inside three hotels when it caught on fire, which was later extinguished by local security forces.

Media
Phidim has three community radio stations: Radio Sumatlung - 104.2 MHz, Eagle FM and Singhalila FM - 97.3 MHz. 2 weekly Newspaper Public Post started around 2009 and Miklajung awaj started in 2 February, 2016.

References

External links
 Phidim Today, a news portal run by Phidimese youth 
 The Kathmandu Post: The Ferment in the eastern hills
 How a peace corps volunteer boosted my morale 
 Somewhere above Phidim
 Phidim in pictures

Populated places in Panchthar District
Nepal municipalities established in 2014
Municipalities in Koshi Province
Municipalities in Panchthar District